Adriana Pop (born Adriana Rednic; October 22, 1965) is a French-Romanian gymnastics choreographer and former rhythmic gymnast.

Career 
Adriana Rednic was born on October 22, 1965 in the Romanian city of Baia Mare. After taking dancing classes for six years, Adriana was directed into artistic gymnastics classes, joining a club in her city. Afraid of the uneven bars and vault, Pop quickly found that dancing her gift; rather than apparatus gymnastics. Soon after, she was directed into rhythmic gymnastics. At the age of thirteen, in 1979, she joined the Romanian National team in Bucharest.

During her career, she trained multiple future World champions, European Champions and Olympics champions, from different countries.

Also, she worked at B.C.G.A gymnastics club in the United States, the club of Nadia Comaneci, Bart Conner and Paul Ziert.

Pop states, "The music is important for me because from the music comes the idea for the routine."

References 

1965 births
Living people
Romanian rhythmic gymnasts
Gymnastics choreographers